Queen Charlotte (Charlotte of Mecklenburg-Strelitz, 1744–1818) was the consort of George III.

Queen Charlotte may also refer to:

People
 Charlotte of Cyprus (1444–1487), queen regnant of Cyprus 
 Charlotte of Savoy (c. 1442–1483), queen consort of France
 Hedvig Elisabeth Charlotte of Holstein-Gottorp (1759–1818), queen consort of Sweden & Norway
 Carlota Joaquina of Spain (1775–1830), queen consort of Portugal
 Charlotte, Princess Royal (1766–1828), queen consort of Württemberg
 Charlotte of Schaumburg-Lippe (1864–1946), queen consort of Württemberg
 Sālote Tupou III (1900–1965), queen regnant of Tonga
 Carlota of Mexico (1840–1927), empress consort of Mexico

Places
 Daajing Giids or Queen Charlotte, a town in British Columbia, Canada on Graham Island
 Gidgalang Kuuyas Naay Secondary School (formerly the Queen Charlotte Secondary School), a high school in Daajing Giids (Queen Charlotte), British Columbia
 Haida Gwaii or Queen Charlotte Islands, an archipelago off the northwest coast of British Columbia, Canada
 Queen Charlotte Channel (British Columbia), a strait between Bowen Island and West Vancouver at the entrance to Howe Sound, Canada
 Queen Charlotte Sound (Canada), a sound in British Columbia between Vancouver Island in the south and the Haida Gwaii (Queen Charlotte) archipelago in the north
 Queen Charlotte Sound / Tōtaranui, one of the Marlborough Sounds in the northeastern coast of the South Island of New Zealand
 Queen Charlotte, Virginia, United States, an unincorporated community in Albemarle County

Other uses
 Queen Charlotte's Ball, London
 Queen Charlotte (ship), several ships
 Queen Charlotte: A Bridgerton Story, an upcoming limited Netflix series

See also
Charlotte (disambiguation)